Dolton may refer to:
 Dolton, Devon, UK
 Dolton, Illinois, USA
 Dolton, South Dakota, USA

Other uses 
 Dolton Records, a record label